Viḷḷalái is one of 54 parishes (administrative divisions) in Cangas del Narcea, a municipality within the province and autonomous community of Asturias, in northern Spain.

Villages
 Coubos
 Las Cuadrieḷḷas de Viḷḷalái
 Viḷḷalái

Other places 
 La Casa la Benita
 La Casa las Mestas
 La Casilla
 Las Mestas
 La Venta la Perra

References

Parishes in Cangas del Narcea